Austrammo is a genus of Australian Ground spiders first described by Norman I. Platnick in 2002.

Species
 it contains four species:
Austrammo harveyi Platnick, 2002 – Australia (Western Australia, South Australia)
Austrammo hirsti Platnick, 2002 – Australia (South Australia, Tasmania)
Austrammo monteithi Platnick, 2002 – Eastern Australia
Austrammo rossi Platnick, 2002 – Australia (Western Australia, Northern Territory)

References

Ammoxenidae
Araneomorphae genera
Spiders of Australia